Philip Morris Pakistan is a Pakistani tobacco manufacturing company which is a subsidiary of Philip Morris International. It is headquartered in Karachi, Pakistan. The company is involved in the manufacturing and sale of cigarettes and tobacco products.

It is the second-largest tobacco company in Pakistan after Pakistan Tobacco Company.

History
The company was founded in 1969 as Lakson Tobacco.

In 2007, Philip Morris International acquired the company by increasing its shareholding to 97 percent.

In 2015, the company shut down its plant in Mandra, Rawalpindi District due to rising costs and smuggling of tobacco in Pakistan. 141 employees lost their jobs.

In 2019, the company announced that they are shutting down Kotri plant in order to restructure their finances. As a result, 193 employees lost their job.

Factories
In the past, the company operated in more than five locations, but to due smuggling and rising cost it shut down in three locations. The company currently operates two factories in following cities:
 Sahiwal
 Mardan

See also
 Tobacco industry in Pakistan

References

Philip Morris International
Manufacturing companies established in 1969
Companies listed on the Pakistan Stock Exchange
Sahiwal
Tobacco companies of Pakistan
Pakistani subsidiaries of foreign companies
Manufacturing companies based in Karachi
Pakistani companies established in 1969